Injibara (Amharic: እንጅባራ) is a town in Ethiopia. It is the administrative center of the Agew Awi Zone in the Amhara Region.

Injibara is situated in a predominantly mountainous location. Entering the town by the Bahir Dar road, it is impossible not to notice the great Mount Zerehi to the right, one of many massive stone monoliths found in the area. Another geographical feature of the area is the Zengena crater lake just south of the town. The hills and valleys receive high amounts of rain, especially in the rainy season. This high rainfall permits farmers to grow multiple crops a year. With this rainy weather comes hail, however, which is a major problem for the local farmers.

Based on figures from the 2007 census , Injibara has an estimated total population of 21,065, of whom 10,596 are males and 10,469 are females.

History 

Injibara was the scene of (in the words of Sven Rubenson) "one of the most bloody battles" of Emperor Tewodros' reign. In 1863, he marched against Tedla Gwalu, who had revolted against him in Gojjam, defeated him, but Tedla Gwalu escaped to continue his revolt against Emperor Tewodros.

Modern Injibara was constructed since 1991 at a place called Kosober by locals, at the junction of Highway 3 from Addis Ababa to Bahir Dar and the road leading west towards Chagni and into Metekel Zone.

References 

Populated places in the Amhara Region